

Tablets of Visitation refers to specific prayers used in the Baháʼí Faith while visiting the shrines of its founders or martyrs.

The Báb, Baháʼu'lláh and ʻAbdu'l-Bahá wrote many Tablets of Visitation. The Tablet of Visitation for the Báb and Baháʼu'lláh is a prayer that is used during visits to the Shrine of Baháʼu'lláh and of the Báb, and is also used during Baháʼí holy days associated with them; the tablet is composed of passages taken from several of Baháʼu'lláh's writings. There is also a Tablet of Visitation for ʻAbdu'l-Bahá which is a prayer that expresses humility and selflessness.

See also
 Ziyarat

Notes

References

Bahá'í texts
Ziyarat
Bahá'í prayer